Columbia High School (West Columbia, Texas) is a public high school located in West Columbia, Texas (United States). It is classified as a 4A school by the UIL. It is the only senior high school in Columbia-Brazoria Independent School District which is located in southwest Brazoria County. In 2015, the school was rated "Met Standard" by the Texas Education Agency.

Mascot 
Elmo is the mascot for the Columbia Roughnecks.

Athletics
The Columbia Roughnecks compete in the following sports:

Baseball
Basketball
Cross Country
Football
Golf
Powerlifting
Soccer
Softball
Tennis
Track and Field
Volleyball

State Titles
Columbia (UIL)
Softball - 
2006(3A)
Girls Track - 
1972(1A)

West Columbia Brown (PVIL)
Boys Basketball - 
1948(PVIL-1A), 1950(PVIL-1A), 1952(PVIL-1A)

Theatre
One Act Play 
1948(1A)

Incidents
In a scene reminiscent of the old TV show 21 Jump Street, police arrested 16 students on April 16, 2010 accused of delivering drugs on Brazoria County's Columbia High School campus after an undercover officer posing as a student named “Victor” allegedly bought the goods from them.  The raid, which took place around 9:30 a.m. during fourth-period classes, took everyone by surprise but was conducted efficiently and quietly with the students being called out of their classrooms and to the office, where they were arrested, school officials said.  The students were charged with felony offenses alleging they delivered drugs in a drug-free zone. Another student who has moved out of Brazoria County will be arrested later, said Sheriff Charles Wagner.  The drugs, bought by a Columbia-Brazoria Independent School District undercover officer during his three-month stint on campus, included marijuana, cocaine, hydrocodone, Xanax and other prescription drugs, Wagner said.  School district police “had developed information they had a problem over there and decided to do something about it,” Wagner said.  Those arrested ranged from freshmen to seniors, spanning ages from 16 to 19, and included two girls. Five are legally considered adults.

Notable alumni

 Charlie Davis, former NFL player
 Dennis Gaubatz, former NFL player
 Jim Ray Smith, former NFL player
 Seth Romero, first round pick in the 2017 MLB Draft by the Washington Nationals
 Jared Wells, former MLB pitcher
 Charlie Johnson, former NFL player

References

External links
Columbia-Brazoria ISD

High schools in Brazoria County, Texas
Public high schools in Texas
West Columbia, Texas